The men's Greco-Roman welterweight competition at the 1936 Summer Olympics in Berlin took place from 6 August to 9 August at the Deutschlandhalle. Nations were limited to one competitor. This weight class was limited to wrestlers weighing up to 72kg.

This Greco-Roman wrestling competition continued to use the "bad points" elimination system introduced at the 1928 Summer Olympics, with a slight modification. Each round featured all wrestlers pairing off and wrestling one bout (with one wrestler having a bye if there were an odd number). The loser received 3 points if the loss was by fall or unanimous decision and 2 points if the decision was 2-1 (this was the modification from prior years, where all losses were 3 points). The winner received 1 point if the win was by decision and 0 points if the win was by fall. At the end of each round, any wrestler with at least 5 points was eliminated.

Schedule

Results

Round 1

Of the seven bouts, five were won by fall giving the winners 0 points. The two other bouts were by unanimous decision, giving the winners 1 point apiece. All 7 losers received 3 points, as none of the losses was by split decision. Hametner withdrew after the first round.

 Bouts

 Points

Round 2

The number of wrestlers with 0 points dropped from five to two; Virtanen had a bye and Svedberg won by fall again. Tozzi's second win was by decision, giving him 1 point. Schäfer also stayed at 1 point, winning by fal in this round. Three wrestlers ended the round with 3 points (win by fall and loss, in either order). Similarly, three continued to the next round with 4 points (win by decision and loss, in either order). There were three wrestlers who had lost twice in the first two rounds; these men were eliminated.

 Bouts

 Points

Round 3

All five bouts were won by fall in this round. The winners stayed on the same score as before (two at 0, one each at 1, 3, and 4 points). Tozzi was the only loser in the round to avoid elimination, as the 3 points of the loss moved him only to a total of 4. The other four losers in the round were eliminated.

 Bouts

 Points

Round 4

Svedberg and Virtanen each picked up their first point, winning by decision. Schäfer stayed at 1 point, winning by fall. The three losers in the round were each eliminated. This left three remaining wrestlers, none of whom had faced each other and each of whom had 1 point. This effectively turned the remaining competition into a round-robin. The official report places Baytorun 5th and Tozzi 6th.

 Bouts

 Points

Round 5

Svedberg and Virtanen were the first pair to compete, with Svedberg winning by decision.

 Bouts

 Points

Round 6

Round 6 was the second pairing among the group of medalists. Virtanen again was up, this time against Schäfer. Virtanen again lost, finishing with the bronze medal.

 Bouts

 Points

Round 7

In the de facto gold medal final, Svedberg defeated Schäfer by split decision to take the Olympic victory. Each man had 3 points, but the result of this round was itself the head-to-head tie-breaker that gave Svedberg the gold.

 Bouts

 Points

References

Wrestling at the 1936 Summer Olympics